The 1900 United States presidential election in Maryland took place on November 6, 1900. All contemporary 45 states were part of the 1900 United States presidential election. Maryland voters chose eight electors to the Electoral College, which selected the president and vice president.

Maryland was won by the Republican nominees, incumbent President William McKinley of Ohio and his running mate Theodore Roosevelt of New York.

As of 2020, this remains the last time Howard County and Baltimore County voted for different candidates.

Results

Results by county

Counties that flipped from Republican to Democratic
Cecil
Harford
Howard

See also
 United States presidential elections in Maryland
 1900 United States presidential election
 1900 United States elections

Notes

References 

Maryland
1900
Presidential